Not to be confused with Hendon Central Tube Station

Hendon railway station is on the Midland Main Line in England, in West Hendon in the London Borough of Barnet, north London. Its three-letter station code is HEN.

The station is served by Thameslink-operated trains on the Thameslink route. It is on the boundary of Travelcard Zone 3 and Zone 4.

It was built by the Midland Railway in 1868 on its extension to St. Pancras. From 1875 the Midland opened a service to Victoria on the London, Chatham and Dover Railway line and received coaches from the London and South Western Railway for attachment to northbound trains.

Location
The station is on Station Road in West Hendon, next to the M1 motorway, about 1 km from Hendon Central.

Services
All services at Hendon are operated by Thameslink using  EMUs.

The typical off-peak service in trains per hour is:
 4 tph to 

Development
From March 2009, Southeastern and Thameslink began running some peak hour trains from Sevenoaks to Luton, though in the off-peak these services turn back at Kentish Town.

In 2017 the London Assembly and Transport for London published a plan to extend the London Overground network to Hendon. The plans are currently at public consultation stage with TfL.

Connections
London Buses routes 83, 183 and school routes 653 and 683 and night route N5 serve the station.

References

External links

Railway stations in the London Borough of Barnet
DfT Category E stations
Former Midland Railway stations
Railway stations in Great Britain opened in 1868
Railway stations served by Govia Thameslink Railway
Railway station